Jeremias Carlos David (born 7 April 1993) is a Dutch footballer who plays as a forward. He most recently played for NWC Asten.

Career
Carlos David started his senior career with Helmond Sport in the Dutch Eerste Divisie, where he made sixteen appearances and scored zero goals. After that, he played for Al Ahli Club, Greenock Morton (on trial), SC Helmondia, VV Gemert, and NWC Asten.

References

External links
 

1993 births
Living people
Dutch footballers
Helmond Sport players
Association football forwards
Footballers from Luanda
Angolan footballers
Dutch people of Angolan descent
Eerste Divisie players
Al-Ahli Club (Manama) players
Vierde Divisie players
Dutch expatriate footballers
Expatriate footballers in Bahrain
Dutch expatriate sportspeople in Bahrain